Qarayazı (also, Karayazy) is a village and municipality in the Goychay Rayon of Azerbaijan.  It has a population of 2,131.

References 

Populated places in Goychay District